Axel Konan may refer to:

Axel Cédric Konan (born 1983), Ivorian footballer
Axel Fabrice Konan (born 1997), Ivorian footballer